Naydi Nazario (born September 10, 1956) is a retired female long-distance runner from Puerto Rico. She competed for her native country at the 1984 Summer Olympics in Los Angeles, California. There she ended up in 33rd place in the women's marathon. Nazario set her personal best in the classic distance (2:45.49) in 1984.

Achievements

References
 sports-reference

1956 births
Living people
Puerto Rican female long-distance runners
Olympic track and field athletes of Puerto Rico
Athletes (track and field) at the 1984 Summer Olympics
Puerto Rican female marathon runners